Macedonia competed at the 2014 Summer Youth Olympics in Nanjing, China, from 16 August to 28 August 2014.

Cycling

Macedonia qualified a boys' team based on its ranking issued by the UCI.

Team

Mixed Relay

Shooting

Macedonia was given a quota to compete by the tripartite committee.

Individual

Team

Swimming

Macedonia qualified one swimmer.

Boys

Wrestling

Macedonia was given a spot to compete from the Tripartite Commission.

Boys

References

2014 in Republic of Macedonia sport
Nations at the 2014 Summer Youth Olympics
North Macedonia at the Youth Olympics